Iris in Bloom is a 2011 French romantic drama film directed and written by  Valérie Mréjen and Bertrand Schefer in their directorial debut. It was screened in the Directors' Fortnight section at the 2011 Cannes Film Festival.

Cast 
 Lola Créton as Iris
 Stanislas Merhar as Jean
 Adèle Haenel as Isabelle
 Valérie Donzelli as Monika
 Ferdinand Régent as Alexandre
 Barthélemy Guillemard as the confident
 Antoine Chappey as the man in the bar  
 Marilyne Canto as Alexandre's mother 
 Serge Renko as Iris' father 
 Frédéric Pierrot Alexandre's father 
 Pascal Cervo as the passing friend 
 Michèle Moretti as Jean's mother 
 Stéphane Bouquet as the teacher 
 Gaëlle Obiégly as a guest
 Thomas Clerc as a guest
 Christophe Wavelet as a dandy
 Françoise Cousin as a woman in the bar
 Katia Beaudufe as the ticket controller 
 Bertrand Schefer as Jérémie 
 Gilles Geenen as Gérald
 Elisa Hildebrandt as Alessa, the German girl

References

External links 
 

2011 films
2011 romantic drama films
2010s French-language films
French romantic drama films
2011 directorial debut films
2010s French films